Cortes Integrated School is an integrated  public elementary school and public secondary school located in Barangay Cortes, Balete, Aklan, Philippines. It currently offers K-12 curriculum. It is recognized by the Department of Education.

References

Schools in Aklan
High schools in the Philippines